The Ingenio Azucarero Vives, also known as Hacienda Vives, is a historic sugar mill complex with ruins of windmill and a processing building, in Barrio Machete of Guayama, in southern Puerto Rico.  Sugarcane was ground by the windmill and the extracted juice was further processed in the processing building, by slaves.  A slave uprising occurred here in the early 1800s.

It was listed on the National Register of Historic Places in 1976.

It is believed to have been constructed by 1828.

In 1976, the site was found to be significant as the only example of early industrial architecture and the only windmill in Puerto Rico.

It was documented by the Historic American Engineering Record program, with photographs by Jack Boucher.

Modern photographs show that the complex has been restored.

References

External links
Coverage in Enciclopedia de Puerto Rico
La Industria Azucarera en Puerto Rico: 1501-2008

Historic American Engineering Record in Puerto Rico
National Register of Historic Places in Guayama, Puerto Rico
Sugar plantations in the Caribbean
Windmills on the National Register of Historic Places
Industrial buildings and structures on the National Register of Historic Places in Puerto Rico
Haciendas in Puerto Rico
1820s establishments in Puerto Rico
Industrial buildings completed in 1828
Slavery in the Spanish Empire
1828 establishments in the Spanish Empire
Sugar industry in Puerto Rico